Micromelo guamensis, common name the Guam paper bubble, is a species of  sea snail, a bubble snail, a marine opisthobranch gastropod mollusk in the family Aplustridae.

Description 
This species has a white shell with black to brownish wavy longitudinal bands. It may in fact be the same species as Micromelo undatus, but it has traditionally been considered to be an Indo-West Pacific species. The shell is too small to hold the whole body, which has a green mantle with white spots and yellowish margins. The length is 10 to 12 mm.

Habitat
This species is found in shallow water, crawling on algae-covered rocks.

Distribution 
This species occurs in South Africa, Japan, and the west coast of Australia.

References

External links 
 Photo of shell

Aplustridae
Gastropods described in 1825